William Sinclair (13 April 1846 – 28 November 1869) was an Australian cricketer. He played one first-class match for New South Wales in 1867/68.

See also
 List of New South Wales representative cricketers

References

1846 births
1869 deaths
Australian cricketers
New South Wales cricketers